{{DISPLAYTITLE:C25H26O3}}
The molecular formula C25H26O3 (molar mass: 374.48 g/mol, exact mass: 374.1882 u) may refer to:

 Adarotene
 Estrone benzoate, or estrone 3-benzoate